Henry Gifford may refer to:

Harry Gifford (1884–1952), English rugby league player
Henry Gifford (MP) (died 1592), MP for Stockbridge
Sir Henry Gifford, 1st Baronet (died c. 1665) of the Gifford baronets
Harry Gifford (songwriter) (1877–1960), born Gifford Folkard, English music hall and comedic songwriter
Henry Gifford (literary scholar), formerly Professor of English & Comparative Literature at the University of Bristol

See also
Gifford (surname)